Owada may refer to:

Empress Masako of Japan (born 1963), née Owada
Hisashi Owada (born 1932), former Japanese diplomat, judge on the International Court of Justice
Hitomi Ōwada, Japanese voice actress
Masashi Owada (born 1981), Japanese football player
 Mondo Owada, fictional character in the game Danganronpa: Trigger Happy Havoc
Nana Owada (born 1999), Japanese idol
Shinya Owada (born 1947), Japanese actor, voice actor and narrator
Tomoko Owada (born 1941), Japanese fencer who competed at the 1964 Olympics

See also
Ōwada Station (disambiguation)